Bruce and Pepper Wayne Gacy's Home Movies also known as Home Movies is a short experimental film by Bruce LaBruce and Candy Parker.

Made in Toronto, Ontario, Canada in 1988, it is filmed in colour and black and white on Super 8mm film and is 12 minutes long.

The conceptual premise of the film is that the audience is watching the home movies of Bruce Wayne Gacy and Pepper Wayne Gacy, the children of the notorious serial killer John Wayne Gacy. The film features various disturbing vignettes filmed in a dysfunctional home; a woman arrives (G. B. Jones) and begins beating up two men, a man (Bruce LaBruce) goes through a range of emotions watching a man (Dave Dictor) attempt to perform drunken oral sex on a woman on a bathroom floor while an oblivious small dog runs about, and a man eats in a deranged manner from a dog food bowl on the floor and howls.

The film stars Bruce LaBruce, G.B. Jones, Dave Dictor, Joe The Ho, David Gravelle.

Bruce and Pepper Wayne Gacy's Home Movies was first shown in 1990 and 1991 by LaBruce and Jones as part of the J.D.s movie screenings in London in the UK, Montreal and Toronto in Canada, and in San Francisco and at Hallwalls in Buffalo in the U.S. It is still being regularly screened at museums and film festivals worldwide.

References

Further reading
Editors: Allan, Yoran; Cullen, Del; Patterson, Hannah,Contemporary North American Film Directors: A Wallflower Critical Guide, Wallflower Press, 2002 
Editors: Ehmke, Ronald and Licata, Elizabeth, Consider the Alternatives: 20 Years of Contemporary Art at Hallwalls, Hallwalls Publishing, 1996

External links

1980s English-language films
Canadian comedy-drama films
1988 comedy-drama films
Films directed by Bruce LaBruce
Queercore films
Canadian LGBT-related short films
Films shot in Toronto
Films about John Wayne Gacy
1988 comedy films
1988 films
1988 drama films
Canadian drama short films
Canadian comedy short films
1980s Canadian films